Phu Phra Bat is a historical park in Ban Phue District, Udon Thani Province, Thailand. The park's distinguishing feature is its unusual rock formations around which religious shrines have been constructed. Some formations also feature prehistoric rock paintings.

The park was established by the Fine Arts Department of Thailand in 1991.

Geography

Rock formations
The unusual rock formations in the park include spires, massive boulders and balanced rocks and form the backdrop for the prehistoric art and religious shrines created there. The geological origins of these rocks are thought to be from under-sea erosion that occurred fifteen million years ago.

Prehistoric art
 Prehistoric art paintings on the rocks can best be seen where some rocks have formed a natural shelter. Others have faded considerably. The formations named Tham Wua and Tham Khon are particularly good examples; in the former oxen are depicted, the latter has human figures. The park's rock paintings are believed to date from 6,000 years ago.

Mythology
Phu Phra Bat's rock formations are the setting for a local legend about a king, his daughter and her suitor. The park's most striking rock formation, Hor Nang Usa, is where the overprotective king forced his beautiful daughter to live. Despite her confinement, she was able to get a message out to her suitor prince and the two were married in defiance of her father.

Religious shrines
 Hor Nang Usa is one of a number of the rock formations where a shrine has been constructed. Early shrines date to the Dvaravati period in the seventh to tenth centuries. Shrines feature Hindu and Buddhist influences.

The park's most significant shrine is Wat Phra Putthabaht Bua Bok, where a Lao-style chedi covers a chamber housing a sandstone Buddha footprint. The shrine is a pilgrimage site with an annual festival held in March.

References

Historical parks of Thailand
Phu Phan Mountains
Tourist attractions in Udon Thani province
Buddhist temples in Udon Thani Province
Prehistoric Thailand